Stethojulis is a genus of wrasses native to the Indian and Pacific Oceans.

Species
The currently recognized species in this genus are:
 Stethojulis albovittata (Bonnaterre, 1788) (blue-lined wrasse)
 
 Stethojulis balteata (Quoy & Gaimard, 1824) (belted wrasse)
 Stethojulis bandanensis (Bleeker, 1851) (red-shoulder wrasse)
 Stethojulis interrupta (Bleeker, 1851) (cutribbon wrasse)
 Stethojulis maculata P. J. Schmidt, 1931
 Stethojulis marquesensis J. E. Randall, 2000
 Stethojulis notialis J. E. Randall, 2000
 Stethojulis strigiventer (E. T. Bennett, 1833) (three-ribbon wrasse)
 
 Stethojulis terina D. S. Jordan & Snyder, 1902
 Stethojulis trilineata (Bloch & J. G. Schneider, 1801) (three-lined rainbowfish)

References

 
Labridae
Marine fish genera
Taxa named by Albert Günther